Blanka Waleská (real name Blanka Wedlichová; 19 May 1910 – 6 July 1986) was a Czech actress.

Career

Waleská was primarily a theatre actress. She also appeared on radio and television and was involved in dubbing.

She starred in the 1970 film Witchhammer under director Otakar Vávra.

References

External links

1910 births
1986 deaths
People from Kolín District
Czech film actresses
Czech stage actresses
Czech voice actresses
Merited Artists of Czechoslovakia
20th-century Czech actresses
Czech LGBT actors
20th-century LGBT people
Prague Conservatory alumni
Lesbian actresses